Alone Together is a 1990 Spanish spy thriller film directed by Eduardo Campoy which stars Victoria Abril and Imanol Arias alongside Juan Echanove.

Plot 
Set in Madrid in 1989, the plot follows Lieutenant Javier Artabe, a military officer attached to the Navy's Intelligence Service, investigating the killing of his partner Carlos Escorial (committed by Álvaro la Huerta) after they did some digging about the windfall revenues of Captain Valenzuela. The witness to the homicide is Gloria, a blind woman.

Cast

Production 
The screenplay was penned by Agustín Díaz Yanes, Eduardo Calvo with the collaboration of Manolo Matji. The films is a Lauren Films, Cartel, and Flamenco Films production. Shooting locations included Madrid. Luis Manuel del Valle was responsible for editing.

Release 
A pre-screening in Madrid was scheduled for 5 September 1990. Distributed by Laurenfilms, the film was theatrically released in Spain on 7 September 1990.

Accolades 

|-
| align = "center" rowspan = "3" | 1991 || rowspan = "3" | 5th Goya Awards || Best Original Screenplay || Agustín Díaz Yanes, Eduardo Calvo, Manolo Matji ||  || rowspan = "3" | 
|-
| Best Actor || Imanol Arias ||  
|-
| Best Supporting Actor || Juan Echanove || 
|}

See also 
 List of Spanish films of 1990

References 

Films shot in Madrid
1990s spy thriller films
Spanish spy thriller films
Films set in Madrid
Films set in 1989
1990s Spanish films
1990s Spanish-language films
Films about blind people